Anthocephalum is a genus of flatworms belonging to the family Rhinobothriidae.

The genus has almost cosmopolitan distribution.

Species:

Anthocephalum alicae 
Anthocephalum blairi 
Anthocephalum cairae 
Anthocephalum centrurum 
Anthocephalum currani 
Anthocephalum decrisantisorum 
Anthocephalum decristanisorum 
Anthocephalum duszynskii 
Anthocephalum gracile 
Anthocephalum gravisi 
Anthocephalum haroldsoni 
Anthocephalum healyae 
Anthocephalum hobergi 
Anthocephalum jeancadenati 
Anthocephalum jensenae 
Anthocephalum kingae 
Anthocephalum lukei 
Anthocephalum mattisi 
Anthocephalum meadowsi 
Anthocephalum michaeli 
Anthocephalum mounseyi 
Anthocephalum odonnellae 
Anthocephalum papefayei 
Anthocephalum philruschi 
Anthocephalum ruhnkei 
Anthocephalum wedli

References

Platyhelminthes